Where There's a Will, There's a Way may refer to:

Name of an episode of The Fresh Prince of Bel-Air (season 4)
"Where There's a Will There's a Way" (song), 1980 song by The Pop Group